Brian Davison is the name of

 Brian Davison (cricketer) (born 1946), former cricketer playing for Rhodesia, Gloucestershire, Leicestershire and Tasmania, ex-member of the Tasmanian House of Assembly 
 Brian Davison (drummer) (1942–2008), British drummer (The Nice, Refugee, Gong)